Ii is a municipality of Finland. It is situated by the Bothnian Bay, at the mouth of river Iijoki, and it is part of the Northern Ostrobothnia region.

The municipality is unilingually Finnish.

Ii merged with Kuivaniemi on 1 January 2007. The new municipality retained the name Ii, but adopted the coat of arms of Kuivaniemi. Ii is notable for having the shortest place name in Finland, and also one of the shortest ones in the world. The etymology is not definitively established; options are either Germanic origin or Sami origin. In the latter, it would mean "a place to stay overnight in"; cf. Northern Sami idja "night".

Beginning in 2008, Ii is home to the ART Ii Biennale of Northern Environmental and Sculpture Art, an international art fair.

The city has ambition to become the first zero waste town in the world, and its municipal manager claims that it does not use fossil fuels for energy.

History 
Ii is named after the river Iijoki. The original name of the settlement was Iijoen kylä, first mentioned in 1374 as Yioki when it was a chapel community within the Pedersöre parish. The marketplace Iin Hamina has existed since the 14th century. Ii became a separate parish sometime before 1445.  

The parish of Ii was originally larger than the modern municipality: it included Pudasjärvi and Taivalkoski until 1639, Kiiminki, Ylikiiminki and Haukipudas until 1858. The municipality of Kuivaniemi was split off in 1919 and Yli-Ii was split off in 1924.

Kuivaniemi became a part of Ii again in 2007. When Yli-Ii was merged into Oulu, a part of it was given to Ii as an exclave. This exclave contains the Pahkakoski hydroelectric power plant.

The village of Jakkukylä and its surroundings, originally part of Yli-Ii and a part of Oulu from 2013, decided to join Ii in 2018.

Notable people 
Juhamatti Aaltonen, ice hockey player
Pekka Ahmavaara, politician and father of Arvi Ahmavaara, another politician
Liisa Hyssälä, politician
Hannu Järvenpää, ice hockey player and coach
Tanja Kari, Paralympic gold medalist in cross-country skiing
Sanna Koivisto, sculptor

References

External links
 
 
 Municipality of Ii – Official website, finnish, english

Municipalities of North Ostrobothnia
Ii
Populated places established in the 1440s
Populated coastal places in Finland